Vincent M. Spano Jr. (born October 18, 1962) is an American film, stage and television actor; he is also a film director and producer.

Early life
Spano was born in Brooklyn, New York to Italian-American parents Vincent Sr. and Theresa.

Career
His career started when he was 14 years old in the Broadway drama The Shadow Box. He was originally credited as Vincent Stewart because his first agent felt the name Spano was "too ethnic", and he was even instructed to sign autographs using that stage name. At age 16, in respect for his Italian heritage, Spano began using his real name and has done so ever since then.

His debut in The Shadow Box was in 1977, first at the Long Wharf Theatre in New Haven, Connecticut and later on Broadway in New York City. Spano's film debut was at the age of 15 in the mystery The Double McGuffin, shot in the winter of 1978. Following The Double McGuffin, he shot Over the Edge in the summer of 1978.

Spano subsequently appeared in many Hollywood films, including the romantic-comedy Baby, It's You (1983), the drama City of Hope (1991), the drama Rumble Fish (1983), the biographical survival drama Alive (1993), the horror television film The Rats (2002), the drama Over the Edge (1979) and the comedy Creator (1985).

In the adventure film The Black Stallion Returns (1983), Spano appeared as a handsome, young, Arabic rider named Raj, who returns home from university to compete in a major horse race and befriends an American boy, Alec Ramsey (Kelly Reno). He also appeared in the Italian drama film Good Morning, Babylon (1987), and the crime drama film Alphabet City (1984). He received a Cable Ace Award nomination in 1988 for his role as Mark Ciuni in Blood Ties (also known as Il cugino americano). He co-starred with Dylan and Cole Sprouse in the comedy film A Modern Twain Story: The Prince and the Pauper (2007). He appeared on ION Television with Lou Diamond Phillips in the Western television film Lone Rider (2008). Spano had a recurring role as FBI Agent Dean Porter on the television series Law & Order: Special Victims Unit since its eighth season in 2006.

In the fantasy horror-thriller film The Prophecy 3: The Ascent (2000), he appeared as Zophael, a handsome angel that was after a young man named Danyeal.

Spano starred in the television movie Landslide (also known as Buried Alive, 2005) as a fireman trapped in a collapsed building with his son.

He has also appeared in Italian projects, including the drama television series L'onore e il rispetto Parte seconda (2009) in the role of the mafia boss Rodolfo di Venanzio, and the film Caldo Criminale (2010) as Police Inspector Lai. He appeared in Criminal Minds: Beyond Borders "Il Mostro" (2017) as Commissario Galterio Conte.

Personal life
Spano has a son, Aljosha Nakszynski (born June 29, 1984) with Nastassja Kinski, his co-star in Maria's Lovers.

Filmography

 1979 The Double McGuffin as Foster Amaway
 1979 Over the Edge as Mark Perry
 1982 A Stranger Is Watching as Gas Thief
 1983 Baby It's You as Albert 'Sheik' Capadilupo
 1983 The Black Stallion Returns as Raj
 1983 Rumble Fish as Steve
 1984 Alphabet City as Johnny
 1984 Maria's Lovers as Al Griselli
 1985 Creator as Boris Lafkin
 1986 Blood Ties (also known as Il cugino americano) as Mark Ciuni
 1987 Good Morning, Babylon as Nicola Bonanno
 1988 High Frequency (aka Qualcuno in ascolto) as Peter
 1988 And God Created Woman as Billy Moran
 1989 Rosso veneziano as Carlo Goldoni
 1990 Heart of the Deal as Mitchell Bryce
 1991 Oscar as Anthony Rossano
 1991 City of Hope as Nick Rinaldi
 1993 Alive as Antonio Balbi
 1993 Indian Summer as Matthew Berman
 1994 The Ascent as Franco Distassi 
 1995 The Tie That Binds as Russell Clifton
 1997 No Strings Attached as Marc Demetrius
 1997 A Brooklyn State of Mind as Al Stanco
 1998 The Christmas Path as Angel
 1998 The Unknown Cyclist as Frank Cavatelli
 1999 Goosed as Steven Binder
 2000 The Prophecy 3: The Ascent as Zophael
 2001 Texas Rangers as Ed Simms
 2003 Silence as Detective Steve Banks
 2005 The Engagement Ring as Tony Di Cenzo
 2007 Nevermore as Devin Bayliss
 2007 A Modern Twain Story: The Prince and the Pauper as Miles
 2009 Fatal Secrets as Scott
 2010 Dante's Inferno: Abandon All Hope as Speaker: 7th Circle The Murderers
 2011 Sangue Caldo as Mauro Malaspina 
 2011 Dante's Inferno Animated as  Virgil (voice)
 2012 Dante's Inferno Documented as Speaker, Virgil
 2013 Dante's Purgatorio Documented as Virgil
 2013 This Magic Moment (TV Movie)   as Roberto Molinez
 2014 Dante's Hell Animated  (Short) as Virgil
 2014 April Rain as Special Agent Thomas
 2015 Pearly Gates as Mayor / Satan
 2015 Badlanders as Prussian Mercenary
 2018 Bent as Charlie Horvath
 2020 The Comeback Trail as Joey
 2020 Half Brothers as Mr. B.

Television work

 1979 Search for Tomorrow as Jackie Peterson
 1981 The Gentleman Bandit as Angel Perez
 1980 Senior Trip as Dick
 1992 Afterburn as Ted Harduvel
 1993 Environmental Media Awards as Himself
 1993 Tales from the Crypt (one episode) as Officer Fine
 1996 Downdraft as Jack
 1997 Medusa’s Child as Scott Nash
 1997-2000 Prince Street (six episodes) as Detective Alex Gage
 The Deadly Look of Love as Brett Becker
 2001 Jenifer as Jack
 2002 The Rats as Jack Carver
 2003 Deathlands: Homeward Bound as Ryan Cawdor
 2004 North Shore (two episodes) as Dan Ralston
 2005 Landslide as Mark Decker
 2005 The Engagement Ring as Tony Di Cenzo
 2006 Her Fatal Flaw as Robert Genaro
 2007 Pandemic as Troy Whitlock
 2008 Lone Rider as Stu Croker
 2008 Grave Misconduct as Trent Dodson
 2006-2009 Law & Order: Special Victims Unit (five episodes) as FBI Agent Dean Porter
 2009 L'onore e il rispetto as Rodolfo Di Venenzio
 2010 Caldo criminale as Ispettore Lai
 2011 House M.D. (episode "Perils of Paranoia") as Tommy
 2014 The Mentalist (one episode) as Don De Jorio
 2014 Castle (one episode) as Christopher Carlucci 
 2017 Criminal Minds: Beyond Borders (one episode) as Commissario Galterio Conte

Directing
Television Shows:
 1994 Tales from the Crypt (one episode: "Two For The Show")
Short Films:

 2002 Tony & Bobby
 2002 High Expectations
 2003 Bet Runner
 2004 Me and My Daddy

Awards

See also

 List of former child actors from the United States
 List of film directors
 List of Italian-American actors
 List of people from Brooklyn, New York

References

External links
 
 

1962 births
20th-century American male actors
21st-century American male actors
Male actors from New York City
American male child actors
American male film actors
Film producers from New York (state)
American male stage actors
American male television actors
Film directors from New York City
Living people
People from Brooklyn
American people of Italian descent